Stay is a compilation album of songs by American new wave band Oingo Boingo. The album was only released in Brazil.

Background
Oingo Boingo had only achieved limited success in Brazil until 1988, when the "live in the studio" double album Boingo Alive brought the band to the top of the charts. Four songs from the album, namely "Stay", "Just Another Day", "Dead Man's Party" and "Not My Slave", became major hits on the Brazilian charts during 1989–1990. This led Polygram Records (the Brazilian MCA representative) to release a compilation album for the band, using the title of the band's hit song "Stay", which had also been featured in the Brazilian soap opera Top Model.

Despite the fact that the radio hits in Brazil were the re-recorded versions from Boingo Alive, the LP presented the original studio recordings of the songs. When the album was issued on CD, the studio versions of "Just Another Day", "Dead Man's Party" and "Not My Slave" were replaced with the versions from Boingo Alive, and the re-recording of "Who Do You Want to Be?" added as a bonus track.

Track listing

LP

CD

Albums produced by John Avila
Albums produced by Danny Elfman
Albums produced by Steve Bartek
1990 compilation albums
Oingo Boingo compilation albums